San Juan Tepezontes is a municipality in the La Paz department of El Salvador. Its name is a Hispanicization of a Nawat term meaning "many hills."  It was incorporated in 1945. Its population as of 2004 was 3,269.

The town was severely damaged by earthquakes in 1857 and twice again in January 2001 and in February 2001.

References

Municipalities of the La Paz Department (El Salvador)
1945 establishments in El Salvador